The Grammy Award for Best Contemporary Classical Composition is an award presented at the Grammy Awards, a ceremony that was established in 1958 and originally called the Gramophone Awards, to composers for quality works of contemporary classical music. Honors in several categories are presented at the ceremony annually by the National Academy of Recording Arts and Sciences of the United States to "honor artistic achievement, technical proficiency and overall excellence in the recording industry, without regard to album sales or chart position".

The award was first presented in 1961 to Aaron Copland for his Orchestral Suite from The Tender Land Suite. It was not presented from 1967 to 1984. The Grammy is awarded to the composer(s) and the librettist (if applicable) of a classical piece composed in the last 25 years, and released for the first time during the eligibility year. The performing artist, orchestra, ensemble, etc., do not receive a Grammy (except if the performer is also the composer). Since its inception, the award has had several minor name changes.

Composers John Adams, Samuel Barber, John Corigliano and Jennifer Higdon are tied for the most wins in this category, with three each. Multiple composers have won twice: Michael Daugherty, Krzysztof Penderecki, Christopher Rouse and Igor Stravinsky. In one year, 1962, the award was given to two composers, Laurindo Almeida and Stravinsky.

Recipients

Notes

References

Grammy Awards for classical music
Awards established in 1961